Josef "Pepi" Strobl (born 3 March 1974 in Holzgau) is a former alpine skier from Austria.

Career 

During his career, he won three World Cup downhills (he gained much attention after winning his first ever World Cup downhill with start number 61), one giant slalom, two Super Gs and one parallel slalom. In the 1996/7 season he was the best placed Austrian in the overall World Cup.

From the 2004/5 season, until the end of his career in 2006, he competed for Slovenia, as he faced problems with qualifying within the extremely strong Austrian skiing team.

World Cup victories

External links 
 
 YouTube video - Josef Strobl at Lauberhorn - - 3rd place - 12-Jan-2002 

1974 births
Living people
Austrian male alpine skiers